Helena Deland is a Canadian singer-songwriter. To date she has released five EPs: Drawing Room (2016) and From the Series of Songs "Altogether Unaccompanied" Vol. I, II, III & IV (2018) that she has written and composed. Her first one-piece album Someone New was released on 15 October 2020. Deland is currently signed to Luminelle Recordings (label founded by Gorilla vs. Bear & Fat Possum Records) for the world as well as Chivi Chivi for Canada. She has toured consistently since the beginning of her career in Canada, United States and Europe.

Biography
Born in Vancouver, British Columbia, Deland grew up in Quebec City and currently lives in Montreal. Her native languages are French and English; however, she primarily writes and sings in English. She began playing piano and guitar as a child and started singing when she moved to Montreal. Deland's inspirations are diverse, including Jessica Pratt, Joni Mitchell, and Sea Oleena.

Deland is featured on "Free The Frail", a song from JPEGMafia's third studio album All My Heroes Are Cornballs.

Her 2020 album Someone New was longlisted for the 2021 Polaris Music Prize, and was a Felix Award nominee for Anglophone Album of the Year at the 43rd Félix Awards.

In 2021, she formed the electronic act Hildegard with Canadian producer Ouri. Their eponymous debut album, recorded over eight days, was released June 4, 2021.

Discography

Studio albums:

 2021: Hildegard (with Hildegard) 2020: Someone New

EPs:

 2016: Drawing Room

Drawing Room is Helena Deland's first EP released on 26 August 2016 under Montreal label Chivi Chivi. Produced by Jesse Mac Cormack, it includes four songs written and composed by Helena.

 2018: From the Series of Songs "Altogether Unaccompanied" Vol. I & II, III & IV

This series of four volumes, produced by Jesse Mac Cormack, was meant to be released as a complete album. The songs were so varied in genre that it was decided to release them separately with the objective of gathering songs that were similar in their themes and sounds. The singer's inspirations have a common theme: human relationships.

Vol. I & II were released on 2 March and Vol. III & IV were released on 19 October 2018 via Luminelle Recordings and Chivi Chivi.

On February 8, 2022, Helena released a new single titled "Swimmer".

Videos

2016: 
"Baby"

2018: 
"Claudion"
"Take it All"
"There Are a Thousand"
2020:

 "Someone New"
 "Truth Nugget"
 "Comfort, Edge"

2021 (with Hildegard):

 "Jour 2"
 "Jour 1"
 "Jour 3"
 "Jour 8"

She also did live sessions for La Blogothèque and CBC Music's First Play Live.

References

Canadian women singer-songwriters
Canadian singer-songwriters
Canadian women pop singers
Living people
Musicians from Montreal
Musicians from Quebec City
Year of birth missing (living people)
21st-century Canadian women singers
Canadian indie pop musicians